Masukulu is an administrative ward in the Rungwe district of the Mbeya Region of Tanzania. According to the 2002 census, the ward has a total population of 9,516.

References

Wards of Mbeya Region